Silver Snake may refer to
Silver snake (Leptotyphlops albifrons), a snake species of South America
the silver Eastern subspecies of the common garter snake, Thamnophis sirtalis sirtalis
Elaith Craulnober, a fictional character often likened to a "silver snake" because of his appearance 
Golden Dragon, Silver Snake, 1979 martial arts film directed by Godfrey Ho 
The Case of the Silver Snake, 1988 film starring Jia Hongsheng
Silver Snakes, band affiliated with the Bridge 9 Records label
Silver Snakes, name of a Star Legion within the Star Fleet (game series)
Silver Snakes, team designation within the Legends of the Hidden Temple children's game show

See also
List of snake genera

Animal common name disambiguation pages